The United States Naval Photographic Science Laboratory (NPSL) was opened in the midst of the Second World War, on 24 February 1943, at the Anacostia Naval Air Station, Washington, D. C.  It was established under the military command of the Chief of the Navy's Bureau of Aeronautics, Division of Photography, with the mission of centralizing the production and preservation of all naval related photography operations.

History
In July, 1941, United States Secretary of the Navy Frank Knox convened a board to study the photographic needs of the United States Navy.  By August, the board had recommended an expansion of operations of the Bureau of Aeronautics to include a photographic facility.  The Eastman Kodak Company would serve as architect, engineer, and equipment producer for the project, which initiated construction at Anacostia Naval Air Station in February, 1942.  While initial operations of the laboratory commenced in February 1943, construction of the Anacostia facility was not completed, and full photographic operations were not underway, until the summer of 1943.

Construction of the facility cost the Navy $2,000,000, with an additional $2,500,000 invested in equipment and materials. Despite the building's size, additional working space had to be found in other buildings at Anacostia. Contributing to the lack of space was the housing of both the Navy Photo Interpretation School as well as the Navy's Photographic Intelligence Center (PIC) on the building's third floor. Sealed off from the rest of the facility, the third floor became one of the most closely guarded top secret areas in all of Washington, D.C.  Here, men and women worked around-the-clock to produce photo mosaics for both the island hopping operations of the Pacific theater, as well as for Operation Overlord - the D-Day invasion of France.

The laboratory was staffed by writers, directors, commentators, animators, cameramen, editors, sound engineers, and musicians.  US Navy WAVES were actively involved in many stages of production.  A sound stage on site at the Anacostia facility was capable of accommodating several productions simultaneously.  The facility's production facilities had the capacity for developing and printing upward of one hundred million feet of film per year.

During its first months of operation, the  provided photographic services exclusively to the Navy, including the conducting of research to develop new photographic equipment and techniques in the areas of motion picture production, still photography, aerial photography, graphic arts and photolithography. It was responsible for providing secret and confidential services at the Anacostia facilities for printing and developing films in quantity and for the training of motion picture camera operators. It was the Navy's sole wartime unit for the production of both live action and animated training films.  
 
During the last two years of the war, the laboratory had expanded its operations to provide production services for any military or governmental activity. The  also served as a storehouse for copies of motion pictures and still photographs sent to the laboratory from war-time fleet and air base operations.  This included, but was not limited to, the in theater work of the Naval Aviation Photographic Unit under the command of Cmdr. Edward Jean Steichen.  Additionally, the laboratory was tasked with preserving and cataloging much of the historical photographic record of prior US military engagements, for all branches of service, dating as far back as the American Civil War.

Naval Photographic Center

Footnotes

Gallery

References

 National Archives Catalog:  Department of the Navy. Bureau of Aeronautics. Naval Photographic Science Laboratory. (2/24/1943 - 1947)
 Bors, Joseph A. "Navy Photo Science Laboratory." Popular Photography, vol. 14, No. 5, May 1944, p. 34-35 & 87.
 Campbell, Douglas E. "FLIGHT, CAMERA, ACTION! The History of U.S. Naval Aviation Photography and Photo-Reconnaissance, 2014"
 DeForge, Gerald T. "Navy Photographer's Mate Training Series: Naval photography. Module 1"
 H. R. Clifford, "United States Naval Photographic Science Laboratories," in Journal of the Society of Motion Picture Engineers, vol. 43, no. 6, pp. 405–413, Dec. 1944.
 Snyder, Cecil C. and Frame, Richard R. ""How Deep is the Ocean?" Popular Mechanics, May 1946, p. 124-125."
 Strock, R. O. and Dickinson, E. A., "Western Electric Recording System—U. S. Naval Photographic Science Laboratory," in Journal of the Society of Motion Picture Engineers, vol. 43, no. 6, Dec. 1944, pp. 379–404.
 Warren, Mame. "Focal Point of the Fleet: U.S. Navy Photographic Activities in World War II." The Journal of Military History, vol. 69 no. 4, 2005, p. 1045-1079. Project MUSE, doi:10.1353/jmh.2005.0268

Photo archives in the United States
Arts organizations established in 1943
1943 establishments in Washington, D.C.